Jon Klette (9 May 1962 – 31 July 2016) was a Norwegian jazz musician, alto saxophone player, composer and record producer. With his group Jazzmob he released the albums The Truth in 1999, and Pathfinder in 2003. He established the record company Jazzaway Records in 2003. He started the band Crimetime Orchestra, where he played with other musicians such as Paal Nilssen-Love, Ingebrigt Håker Flaten, Vidar Johansen, Bugge Wesseltoft, Per Zanussi, Sjur Miljeteig and Kjetil Møster, and their albums include Life Is a Beautiful Monster (2004), Atomic Symphony (2009).

References

External links

1962 births
2016 deaths
Norwegian jazz musicians
Norwegian saxophonists
Norwegian composers
Norwegian male composers
Male jazz musicians
20th-century saxophonists